This is a chronological list of Bath City Football Club managers, comprising all those who have held the position of manager for the first team. From the glory days of Ted Davis in the 1930s, to Malcolm Allison in the 1963–1964 season, to the present with former player Jerry Gill.

Bath City's history is entirely in non-League football, predominantly in the fourth tier from 1921 to 1959 (before the formation of the Football League Fourth Division in 1959) and then the fifth tier from 1960 to the late 1990s, though being relegated to the sixth on several occasions. Bath have narrowly missed out on election to the Football League by a small margin on multiple occasions, some of which, include 1935, 1978 and in 1985, though the club have been in talks for entry to the English Football League through out their entire history, most notably from the 1930s, to the 1970s. The club have a good history in the FA Cup, reaching the third round six times, and have beaten league sides including Crystal Palace (in 1931), Millwall (in 1959), and Cardiff City (in 1992).

In total, Bath have won two Southern League Western Section (level 4) titles (1929–30, 1930–33), two Southern League (level 5) titles (1959–60, 1977–78), one Conference South (level 6) play off, one Southern Football League (level 7) title (2006–07), one Southern League Cup, one non league championship trophy, one Football League North (1943–44) and twenty-four Somerset Premier Cups. The list shows the clubs 31 managers from 1907 onwards, not including the role of 'caretaker'. Only Ted Davis, Charles pinker  and Gary Owers have managed the club on two occasions. The longest serving manager was Ted Davis from 1927–1937 and then 1939–1947,  for a total of 17 years, he is also the clubs most successful manager.

Key 

Key to record:
 Pld = Matches played
 W = Matches won
 Av Pos T4 = Average league position in the fourth tier (before 1959 and the formation of the Football League Forth Division)
 A Pos T5 = Average league position in the fifth tier
 A Pos T6 = Average league position in the sixth tier
 A Pos T7 = Average league position in the seventh tier

Key to honours:
 L4 = Fourth tier (Southern League West)
 L5 = Fifth tier (National League,  Alliance Premier League, Southern League)
 L6 =  Sixth tier (Southern Football League, National League South)
 L7 = Seventh tier (Southern Football League)
 SC = Somerset Premier Cup
 FA = FA Trophy

List of Managers 
Information correct . Only competitive matches are counted.

Caretaker managers are not included.

Key

Most trophies won
As of 23 October 2022
The significance/prestige of the trophy won is also taken into account.

Footnotes

References

External links

 Official website
 Bath City Youth FC website 
 Bath City F.C. on BBC Sport: results and fixtures
 Vanarama National League Official website
 Supporters' Society

 
City F.C.